Story of Seasons: Trio of Towns, known in Japan as , is a farming simulation role-playing game developed by Marvelous for the Nintendo 3DS. The game was released in June 2016 in Japan, February 2017 in North America, and in October 2017 in Europe and Australia. In this installment, in addition to the usual farmland which the player owns, the player is able to visit three towns, each with their own distinct culture and lifestyles. 

Like the previous installment, Trio of Towns features a Super Mario collaboration. However, instead of crops, it's in the form of costumes.

Release
People who pre-ordered the game received a capybara "pocket plushie", a stuffed doll that stood 3.5” tall.

Reception

The game received above-average reviews according to the review aggregation website Metacritic. IGN said that the game was a fun farming simulator with a "low-pressure approach and gorgeous 3DS graphics." All four reviewers for Japanese gaming magazine Famitsu gave the game an 8/10, totalling to a combined score of 32/40.

References

External links
Marvelous Inc. page 
Xseed NA Page 

2016 video games
Story of Seasons games
Marvelous Entertainment
Nintendo 3DS games
Nintendo 3DS eShop games
Nintendo 3DS-only games
Nintendo Network games
Video games developed in Japan
Video games featuring protagonists of selectable gender
Xseed Games games
Single-player video games